Free the Bears may refer to:

 Free the Bears Fund, an Australian charitable wildlife-protection organisation
 Setting Free the Bears, 1968 novel by American author John Irving